is a district located in Kagawa Prefecture, Japan.

As of the Takamatsu merger but using 2000 population data, the district has an estimated population of 41,598 and a density of 353 persons per km2. The total area is 117.74 km2.

Towns and villages 
Ayagawa
Utazu

Mergers 
 On March 22, 2005, the towns of Ayauta and Hanzan merged into the expanded city of Marugame.
 On January 10, 2006 the town of Kokubunji, along with the towns of Mure and Aji, both from Kita District, and the towns of Kagawa and Kōnan, both from Kagawa District merged into the expanded city of Takamatsu.
 On March 21, 2006 the towns of Ayakami and Ryōnan merged to form the new town of Ayagawa.

References
 :ja:綾歌郡 - Japanese Wikipedia article on Ayauta District

Districts in Kagawa Prefecture